Morteza Gerd (also Romanized as Morteẕá Gerd) is a village in Khalazir Rural District of Aftab District of Tehran County, Tehran province, Iran. At the 2006 National Census, its population was 3,556 in 837 households. The following census in 2011 counted 8,217 people in 2,249 households. The latest census in 2016 showed a population of 15,506 people in 4,474 households; it was the largest village in its rural district.

References 

Tehran County

Populated places in Tehran Province

Populated places in Tehran County